Mark Coles Smith (born 1989) is an Indigenous Australian actor originally from Broome in Western Australia. He is known for his roles in Last Cab to Darwin (2015), Picnic at Hanging Rock (2018) and Occupation: Rainfall (2020), as well as the Canadian series Hard Rock Medical (2013-18).

Early life 
Coles Smith was born in Broome around 1989, and made his debut in the Network Ten children's TV show Ocean Star at the age of 14 after being taken to an open audition by his aunt.

In 2007, Coles Smith received the VCA Wilin Centre for Indigenous Arts' Yvonne Cohen Award, and graduated from the Western Australian Academy of Performing Arts in Aboriginal Theatre.

Filmography

Personal life
Since 2015, Coles Smith lives in Melbourne.

References

External links
 

Living people
1989 births
21st-century Australian male actors
Australian male child actors
Australian male film actors
Australian male television actors
Helpmann Award winners
Indigenous Australian male actors